Trioecy, or subdioecy, is a rare sexual system characterized by the coexistence of males, females, and hermaphrodites. It has been found in both plants and animals. Trioecy is sometimes referred to as a mixed mating system alongside androdioecy and gynodioecy.

Evolution of trioecy 
Many speculate trioecy is a transient state and is often associated with evolutionary transitioning from gynodioecy to dioecy. Other studies show that trioecious populations originated from gonochoristic ancestors which were invaded by a mutant selfing hermaphrodite, creating a trioecious population. It has been suggested that chromosomal duplication is an important part in the evolution of trioecy.

Evolutionary stability 
Trioecy is usually viewed as evolutionarily unstable, but its exact stability is unclear. Like in brachiopod species trioecy usually breaks into androdioecy or gynodioecy.

But one study found that trioecy can be stable under nucleocytoplasmic sex determination. Another theoretical analysis indicates that trioecy could be evolutionary stable in plant species if a large amount of pollinators vary geographically.

Occurrence 
Trioecy is a relatively common sexual system in plants. Trioecy has been estimated to occur in about 3.6% of flowering plant species, although most reports of trioecy could be misinterpretations of gynodioecy. It is rare as well as poorly understood in animals.

Species that exhibit trioecy 
The following species have been observed to exhibit a trioecious breeding system.

Plants 
 Buddleja sessiliflora
 Buddleja americana
Coccoloba cereifera
Garcinia indica
Fraxinus excelsior
 Mercurialis annua
 Opuntia robusta
 Pachycereus pringlei

Animals 
 Aiptasia diaphana
Auanema rhodensis
Auanema freiburgensis
Hydra viridissima
Thor manningi 
Semimytilus algosus Pacific mussel

See also 

 Dioecy
 Gynodioecy
 Androdioecy
 Hermaphrodite
 Monoicy

References 

Reproductive system
Fertility
Sex
Sexual system